Hutubi County as the official romanized name, also transliterated from Uyghur as Kutubi County, is a county in the Xinjiang Uyghur Autonomous Region and is under the administration of the Changji Hui Autonomous Prefecture. It contains an area of 9,476 km2. According to the 2002 census, it has a population of 210,000. 
 

Climate

Transport 
Hutubi is served by China National Highway 312, the Northern Xinjiang and the Second Ürümqi–Jinghe Railways.

Petroglyphs 
Petroglyphs were recorded in Qutubi County at Kangjiashimenzi and are interpreted as representing male fertility worship. This is because in the two depictions of copulation, the males have faces on their chests, suggesting that the petroglyph's creators believed that males were the source of children. The alleged superiority of the petroglyph's male subjects was the basis for the researcher's conclusion that they were created after 1500 BCE, when it is believed that matriarchal societies were replaced by patriarchies.

Footnotes 

County-level divisions of Xinjiang
Changji Hui Autonomous Prefecture